Guyencourt is an unincorporated community in New Castle County, Delaware, United States. Guyencourt is located at the intersection of Delaware Route 100 and Guyencourt Road, north of Wilmington and south of the Pennsylvania border.

Notable person
Charles Swayne, United States District Court judge, was born in Guyencourt.

References 

Unincorporated communities in New Castle County, Delaware
Unincorporated communities in Delaware